Playboy is a men's magazine. 

Playboy may also refer to:

Entities associated with Playboy Enterprises
 Playboy Enterprises, the publisher of Playboy Magazine
 Playboy Foundation, a non-profit charity
 Playboy Mansion, the home of Playboy Enterprises head Hugh Hefner
 Playboy Club, a chain of nightclubs run by Playboy Enterprises
 Playboy Bunny, a waitress at a Playboy Club
 Playboy Club (Las Vegas)
 Playboy Playmate, the featured model in an issue of Playboy magazine
 Playboy Jazz Festival

Media
 Playboy Special Edition, a spin-off of Playboy magazine
 Playboy (Brazil), the Brazilian edition of Playboy magazine
 Monthly Playboy, the Japanese edition of Playboy magazine
 Australian Playboy
 Playboy TV, cable channel formerly known as The Playboy Channel
 Playboy One, a satellite television channel in the United Kingdom
 Playboy Online
 Playboy Press, their imprint for book publishing
 Playboy Radio
 Playboy Records, a record label
 Playboy: The Mansion, a 2005 video game

Music
 Playboy (The Marvelettes album)
 "Playboy" (The Marvelettes song)
 "Playboy" (Ann Christine song)
 "Playboy" (Gene & Debbe song)
 "Playboy" (Trey Songz song)
 "Playboy", a 2009 single by Candy Coated Killahz
 "Playboy", a 2004 song by Lloyd Banks from his album The Hunger for More
 "Playboy", a 2004 song by Hot Chip from their album Coming on Strong
 "Playboy", a 2015 song by Exo from their album Exodus (Exo album)
 "Playboy", a 2022 song by twlv
 Bad Girl (La Toya Jackson album) or Playboy, an album and song by La Toya Jackson
 Playboys (The Rasmus album)
 "Playboys" (song), the title track to the album above
 Playboys (Chet Baker & Art Pepper album), 1956

Transportation
 Playboy Automobile Company, an automobile company (1947–51)
 Stits Playboy, a single seat homebuilt airplane
 Kinner Playboy, two-seat airplane

Media
 The Playboy Club, a 2011 American crime drama television series
 The Playboy, a graphic novel
 The Playboys, 1992 film starring Robin Wright
 Playboy: A Portfolio of Art and Satire, periodical published by Egmont Arens 1919-1924
 Weekly Playboy, a Japanese magazine not affiliated with Playboy Enterprises

Other
 Jeremy Klein, nicknamed Playboy, American professional skateboarder
 Playboy lifestyle
 Playboys gang, a street gang in Southern California and various other states
 Play-Boy (pinball), a pinball machine

See also 
 Playmen, a defunct Italian adult entertainment magazine modeled on the American Playboy
 Lycaenidae, a butterfly family, several of whose species' common names include "playboy"
 Playboi Carti (born 1996), American rapper
 Playgirl (disambiguation)
 Playmates (disambiguation)